Thomas Falvey (7 August 1880 – 17 February 1941) was an Irish politician. A farmer, he was elected to Dáil Éireann at the June 1927 general election as a Farmers' Party Teachta Dála (TD) for the Clare constituency. He lost his seat at the September 1927 general election.

Falvey was a member of Clare County Council when elected as a TD and lived in Kilkee, County Clare.

References

1880 births
1941 deaths
Farmers' Party (Ireland) TDs
Members of the 5th Dáil
Politicians from County Clare
Irish farmers